The following is a list of festivals in Colombia, including arts festivals, music festivals, folk festivals, and cultural festivals, among other types.

Festivals by type

Traditional and cultural Colombian festivals 

January
Campeonato de Voleibol Playa - Cartagena - Bolívar
Carnaval de Blancos y Negros - Pasto - Nariño
Carnaval de Riosucio - Riosucio - Caldas 
Carnavales de Ocaña - Norte de Santander
Cartagena Festival Internacional de Música - Cartagena - Bolívar
Feria de Cali - Cali - Valle del Cauca
Feria de Manizales - Manizales - Caldas
Feria Taurina - Cartagena - Bolívar
Feria Taurina de la Candelaria - Medellín - Antioquia
Festival de la Miel - Oiba - Santander
Festival de La Panela - Villeta - Cundinamarca
Fiesta de las Corralejas - Sincelejo
Hay Festival - Cartagena - Bolívar
Reinado del Arroz - Aguazul - Casanare
Reinado Departamental de la Panela - Villeta
Sirenato del Mar - Tolu

February 
Carnaval de Barranquilla - Barranquilla - Atlántico
Carnaval del Fuego - Tumaco - Nariño
Feria Taurina Bogotá
Festival de la Subienda - Honda - Tolima
Festival del Corrido Llanero - Puerto Carreño - Vichada
Fiesta de la Candelaria - Cartagena - Bolívar
Temporada Taurina - Medellín - Antioquia

March
Exposición Internacional de Orquídeas - Medellín 
Ferias y Fiestas - Acacías - Meta
Festival de la Canción Llanera - Villavicencio - Meta
Festival de Música Religiosa - Popayan - Mompox - Pamplona
Festival del Burro - San Antero - Cordoba
Festival Iberoamericano de Teatro - Bogotá 
Festival internacional de cine - Cartagena
Holy Week in Popayán 
 
April 
Feria del Cebú - San Martín - Meta
Festival de Cine Eurocine - Bogotá
Festival de Luna Verde - San Andrés
Festival del Cangrejo - San Andrés Islas 
Festival Internacional de la Leyenda Vallenata - Valledupar

May
Feria Ganadera - Socorro - Santader
Feria Internacional del Libro - Bogotá
Ferias y Fiestas de Natagaima - Tolima
Festival de Interpretes de la Canción Mono Nuñez - Ginebra - Valle
Festival de la Arepa de Huevo - Luruaco - Atlántico
Festival de la Cachama - Puerto Gaitan - Meta
Festival de la Cultura Wayuú - Guajira
Fiestas del San Pedro y Festival del Bunde Tolimense - Espinal - Tolima

June
Corpus Christi - Anolaima
Feria Nacional Gallistica - Monteria 
Festival del Mango - San Antonio Atlántico
Festival del Mono Nuñez - Ginebra - Valle
Festival Folclórico - Ibague Tolima
Festival Folclórico del Caqueta - Florencia Caqueta
Festival Folclorico y Reinado Nacional del Bambuco - Neiva - Huila
Festival Internacional de Jazz - Villa de Leyva
Festival Internacional de Tango - Medellín
Festival Nacional del Porro - San Pelayo - Monteria
Festival y Reinado del Divivi - Rioacha - Guajira
Reinado Nacional de la Ganadería - Monteria - Córdoba
Reinado Nacional del Bambuco - Neiva - Huila
Reinado Nacional del Cafe - Calarca - Quindio

July
Feria Agropecuaria - Charalá - Santander 
Feria de la Piña - Lebrija - Santander
Ferias y Fiestas de la Panela - Convención - Santander
Festival de la Cumbia - El Banco - Magdalena
Festival de la Feijoa - Tibasosa, Boyacá
Festival del sol y del acero - Sogamoso, Boyacá
Fiestas del mar - Santa Marta
International Poetry Festival of Medellín
Opera al Parque - Bogotá
Torneo Internacional del Joropo - Villavicencio

August 

Boyacá International Cultural Festival - Tunja, Boyacá
Colombiamoda - Medellín 
Desfile de Silleteros - Medellín 
Feria de las Flores - Medellín 
Festibuga - Buga - Valle Del Cauca
Festival de Cometas - Villa De Leyva
Festival de la Bahía - Bahía Solano
Festival de Tiple y la Guabina - Veléz - Santander
Festival de Verano - Bogotá
Festival Folclórico del Litoral Pacifico - Buenaventura
Festival Petronio Alvarez - Cali
Fiesta del Petróleo - Barrancabermeja
Fiestas de La Cosecha - Pereira, Risaralda
Fiestas del Maíz - Sonsón, Antioquia
Fiestas Folclóricas - Capitanejo - Santander

September
Boyacá International Cultural Festival - Tunja, Boyacá
Concurso Nacional de bandas - Paipa, Boyaca
Feria Bonita - Bucaramanga
Festival Cuna de  - Villa Nueva - Guajira
Festival de la Talla en Piedra - Barichara 
Festival de la Trova - Medellín
Festival de Música Folclórica - Socorro - Santander
Festival Internacional del Jazz del Teatro Libre - Bogotá
Festival Latinoamericano de Teatro - Manizales - Caldas
Fiestas de San Pacho - Quibdó - Chocó
Green Moon Festival - San Andrés Islas 
Jazz al Parque - Bogotá

October 
Concurso Nacional de Duos - Armenia - Quindio
Encuentro Mundial de Coleo - Villavicencio - Meta
Feria Internacional de Bogotá
Festival de Cine - Bogotá
Festival Latinoamericano de Danzas Folclóricas - Guacarí - Valle del Cuaca 
Festival Nacional de Gaitas - Ovejas - Sucre
Festival y Reinado Nacional del Carbón - Barrancas - Guajira)
Reinado Nacional de la Cosecha - Granada - Meta 
Reinado Nacional de Turismo - Girardot - Cundinamarca
Reinado Nacional del Turismo - Girardot - Cundinamarca

November
Concurso Nacional de Belleza - Cartagena 
Festival del Caballo - Villa de Leyva
Festival Internacional de Cine Independiente - Villa de Leyva
Festival Internacional Folclórico y Turístico del Llano - San Martin - Meta 
Fiesta Nacional de la Agricultura - Palmira - Valle
Reinado Internacional de Coco - San Andres

December 
Aguinaldo Boyacense - Tunja 
Desfile de Danzas, Mitos y Leyendas - Medellin
Expoartesanias - Bogotá - CORFERIAS 
Feria de Cali - Cali
Festival de Arte "Memoria e Imaginacion" - Cartagena
Festival de Luces - Villa De Leyva
Fiesta de Velas y Faroles - Quimbaya Quindio
Torneo Internacional de Contrapuenteo y La Voz Recia - Yopal Arauca

Regional and folkloric festivities 

Candles and Lanterns Festival (Spanish: Fiesta de Velas y Faroles) is held in Quimbaya, Quindío on December 7 and 8.  Each of the barrios in the township compete to produce the most spectacular lighting arrangements.
 Carnival of Riosucio (Spanish: Carnaval de Riosucio) held in Riosucio, Caldas within the first two weeks of January every two years. In 2009 it was held from 2 to 8 January and in 2011 from 6 to 12 January. It remembers past traditions with a mixture of art, music and costumes by groups called cuadrillas, drinking the traditional guarapo carried in calabazos. During the carnival, the image of a cool and happy devil is exhibited.
Colombian Folklore Festival (Spanish: Festival Folklórico Colombiano) in Ibagué.
El dia de las velas, The day of the candles held on December 7.
Festival of the Wayuu Culture in La Guajira Department.
Festivities of Our Lady of the Remedies in La Guajira Department.
Green Moon Festival (Spanish: Festival de la Luna Verde) celebrated in the Archipelago of San Andrés, Providencia and Santa Catalina, this is a unique festival with characteristics that make it different from any other festival in Colombia. Here the Afro-Caribbean influence is very strong, and predominance of the English-language lyrics of Calypso and Reggae.
Harvest Festival of Pereira (Spanish: Fiestas de la Cosecha de Pereira),  in Pereira.
Joropo National Festival (Spanish: Festival Nacional del Joropo) in Villavicencio in December.
Medellin's Tango Street (Spanish: Tangovía) on Carlos Gardel Avenue in the suburb of Manrique.
National Festival of the Dividivi in La Guajira Department.
 Pubenza Festivities (Spanish: Fiestas de Pubenza), in Popayán, known for its competition of Chirimias (folkloric musical groups).
The Yipao or Jeep Parade in Armenia, Colombia

Film festivals 

Bogotá Film Festival
Cartagena Film Festival

Artistic and theatre festivals 

 The Boyacá International Cultural Festival (Spanish: Festival Internacional de la Cultura de Boyacá) held annually in Tunja, is one of the biggest culture and arts festivals in Latin America.
 The Ibero-American Theater Festival held in Bogotá every two years, is the biggest theater festival in the world.
 The International Festival of Theater City of Manizales

Music festivals

Folkloric and traditional
Boyacá International Cultural Festival (Festival Internacional de la Cultura de Boyacá, Tunja.
Colombia al Parque (Bogotá)
Cradle of Accordions Festival (Festival Cuna de Acordeones, Villanueva, La Guajira)
Festival Folclórico y Reinado Nacional del Bambuco (Neiva)
Festival of the Laurels (Distracción, La Guajira)
Pubenza Festivities (Popayán)
Salsa al Parque (Bogotá)
Vallenato Legend Festival (Festival de la Leyenda Vallenata, Valledupar, in April or May.  The festival is a celebration of vallenato music and also a competition to find the best accordionist of the year and to select the Vallenato King (Spanish: Rey Vallenato) among hundreds of participants from all over the country.
World Day of Laziness (Itagüí)

Other
Baum Festival (Bogotá)
Cali Underground (Cali)
Estéreo Picnic Festival (Bogotá)
Festival Internacional de Jazz (Bogotá)
Festival Latinoamérica de Concierto (Bogotá)
Hip Hop al Parque (Bogotá)
Jamming Festival (Bogotá)
Jazz al Parque (Bogotá)
Manizales Grita Rock (Manizales)
Ópera al Parque (Bogotá)
Rock al Parque (Bogotá) in July, is the second largest rock festival in Latinamerica, after Rock in Rio. Around 1000 rock bands have participated in this event; both local and international bands. Apocalyptica, Slipknot, Plastilina Mosh and Manu Chao have performed in Rock al Parque, among other internationally famous bands. The event is held annually in Simón Bolívar Park in Bogotá. In 2004, 400,000 people took part in the event.
Storyland Festival (Cartagena)

See also

List of festivals
List of festivals in La Guajira
List of music festivals

References

External links

 

 Colombia